The 1991 NHK Trophy was held in Hiroshima. Medals were awarded in the disciplines of men's singles, ladies' singles, pair skating, and ice dancing.

Results

Men

Ladies

Pairs

Ice dancing

External links
 1991 NHK Trophy

Nhk Trophy, 1991
NHK Trophy